The kile was an Ottoman unit of volume similar to a bushel, like other dry measures also often defined as a specific weight of a particular commodity.  Its value varied widely by location, period, and commodity, from 8 to 132 oka. The 'standard' kile was 36 litres or 20 oka.

References

 Diran Kélékian, Dictionnaire Turc-Français, Constantinople: Imprimerie Mihran, 1911.
 A.D. Alderson and Fahir İz, The Concise Oxford Turkish Dictionary, 1959.
 Halil İnalcık, Donald Quataert, An Economic and Social History of the Ottoman Empire, 1300-1914, Cambridge University Press, 1997. . Has extensive tables of values of the kile at various times and places.

Obsolete units of measurement
Units of mass
Units of volume
Turkish words and phrases
Ottoman units of measurement